Kamouraska—Rivière-du-Loup was a federal electoral district in Quebec, Canada, that was represented in the House of Commons of Canada  from 1979 to 1997.

This riding was created in 1976 from parts of Kamouraska and Rivière-du-Loup—Témiscouata ridings. It was abolished in 1996, and redistributed between Kamouraska—Rivière-du-Loup—Témiscouata—Les Basques and Bellechasse—Etchemins—Montmagny—L'Islet ridings.

Kamouraska—Rivière-du-Loup consisted of the City of Rivière-du-Loup; the Towns of La Pocatière, Pohénégamook, Saint-Pascal and Trois-Pistoles; the Counties of Kamouraska and Rivière-du-Loup; and the parish municipality of Sainte-Louise and the municipality of Saint-Roch-des-Aulnets in the County of L'Islet.

In 1987, the riding was redefined to consist of the towns of La Pocatière, Pohénégamook, Rivière-du-Loup, Saint-Pascal and Trois-Pistoles; the counties of Kamouraska and Rivière-du-Loup; the Parish Municipality of Sainte-Louise and the Municipality of Saint-Roch-des-Aulnaies in the County of L'Islet; and the parish municipalities of Saint-Mathieu-de-Rioux and Saint-Simon; the municipalities of Saint-Guy and Saint-Médard; the Territory of Rimouski-Lac-Boisbouscache portion in the County of Rimouski.

Members of Parliament

This riding elected the following Members of Parliament:

Election history

|-

|Liberal
|Rosaire Gendron
|align="right"|15,328

|Progressive Conservative
|  Claude Langlais
|align="right"| 5,662

|Independent
|Jean-Noël Lagacé
|align="right"|515

|New Democratic
|Marc Lord
|align="right"|357

|Liberal
|Rosaire Gendron
|align="right"|19,117

|Progressive Conservative
|  Yvan Dionne
|align="right"|1,519

|Progressive Conservative
|André Plourde
|align="right"|19,651

|Liberal
| Pierre Pettigrew
|align="right"|12,922

|New Democratic
|Victor Bibaud
|align="right"| 1,550

|Independent
|Jean-Noël Lagacé
|align="right"|233

|Progressive Conservative
|André Plourde
|align="right"|20,388

|Liberal
|  Gilles Desjardins
|align="right"|10,353

|New Democratic
|Maurice Tremblay
|align="right"|3,257

|No affiliation
|Pierre-Paul Malenfant
|align="right"|192

|Progressive Conservative
|André Plourde
|align="right"|8,052

|Liberal
|  Maurice Tremblay
|align="right"|7,479

|Independent
|Pierre-Paul Malenfant
|align="right"|542

|New Democratic
|Hélène Bois
|align="right"| 476

See also 

 List of Canadian federal electoral districts
 Past Canadian electoral districts

External links 

 Website of the Parliament of Canada

Former federal electoral districts of Quebec
Rivière-du-Loup